Kim Hyun-yung (born October 19, 1994 in Seoul) is a South Korean speed-skater.

Kim competed at the 2014 Winter Olympics for South Korea. In the 500 metres she finished 24th overall, and in the 1000 metres she was 28th.

As of September 2014, Kim's best performance at the World Single Distance Speed Skating Championships is 22nd, in the 2013 500 m. Her best performance at the World Sprint Speed Skating Championships is 12th, in 2014. Kim has won five medals across four World Junior Speed Skating Championships, including the 500 m championship in 2013.

Kim made her World Cup debut in November 2011. As of September 2014, Kim's top World Cup finish is 15th in a 1000 m race at Salt Lake City in 2013–14. Her best overall finish in the World Cup is 22nd, in the 2013–14 1000 m.

References

External links

1994 births
Living people
South Korean female speed skaters
Speed skaters at the 2014 Winter Olympics
Speed skaters at the 2018 Winter Olympics
Speed skaters at the 2022 Winter Olympics
Olympic speed skaters of South Korea
Speed skaters from Seoul
Korea National Sport University alumni
Universiade medalists in speed skating
Speed skaters at the 2017 Asian Winter Games
Universiade gold medalists for South Korea
Universiade silver medalists for South Korea
Competitors at the 2013 Winter Universiade
21st-century South Korean women